The Pennsylvania State Hospital System is a network of psychiatric hospitals operated by the Commonwealth of Pennsylvania. At its peak in the late 1940s the system operated more than twenty hospitals and served over 43,000 patients.  fewer than nine sites remain in use, and many of those serve far fewer patients than they once did. Many facilities or portions of facilities no longer in use for psychiatric treatment have been repurposed to other uses, while some have been demolished.

The first facility in the Pennsylvania State Hospital system, Harrisburg State Hospital, opened in 1845 and from its inception was tasked with providing care for mentally ill persons throughout the Commonwealth of Pennsylvania. Many facilities within the system were state-operated from the start, while some initially operated as county poor farms, county hospitals, or other institutions.

As the number of institutionalized mentally ill dwindled many state hospitals have been, in whole or in part, converted to other uses. Many have remained state-operated facilities, such as office building repurposed as correctional centers. A few former state hospitals have been demolished.

NOT ON CHART*
Western Center was also a state facility for the mentally disabled and was located in Canonsburg, Washington County, Pennsylvania.  It consisted of multiple buildings.  It closed in the late 1980s or early 1990s.  Southpoint (a commercial development) now sets on the site that was once Western Center.

Plans

Most state hospitals consisted of a number of individual buildings spread across an often rural "campus." Most can be characterized as falling into one of several "plans" or designs.

Kirkbride plan

Kirkbride Plan refers to a system of mental asylum design advocated by Philadelphia psychiatrist Thomas Story Kirkbride in the mid-19th century. Kirkbride developed his requirements based on a philosophy of Moral Treatment.  The typical floor plan, with long rambling wings arranged "en echelon" (staggered, so each connected building still received sunlight and fresh air), was meant to promote privacy and comfort for patients.  The building form itself was meant to have a curative effect. These asylums tended to become large, imposing, Victorian-era institutional buildings within extensive surrounding grounds which often included farmland. By 1900 the notion of "building-as-cure" was largely discredited, and in the following decades these facilities became too expensive to maintain.

Cottage plan

By the middle of the nineteenth century, some doctors complained that large monolithic asylums had not lived up to their expectations.  But psychiatrists did not immediately abandon their belief in the therapeutic environment; instead, they argued for a different therapeutic environment. Clinging to a belief that architecture influenced human conduct, they proposed smaller cottage-like structures to replace the Kirkbride-plan hospitals.  These cottages were to be arranged in a village, an homage to the Belgian town of Gheel, where citizens looked after mentally ill people who for centuries gathered there to worship at the shrine of St. Dymphna, the patron saint of lunatics.

Echelon plan

Payton plan

List of Pennsylvania State Hospitals

Pennsylvania State General Hospitals

During the late 1800s, the State built many hospitals for coal miners in Pennsylvania, these hospitals were also referred to as State Hospitals for Miners.  These hospitals were not built as psychiatric facilities, but rather as general medical hospitals.  In 1985, Pennsylvania began the transfer of these hospitals from State ownership into private or community facilities.  As of 1992, all have been divested from State ownership.

State Hospitals for Miners 

 Ashland State General Hospital Divested from state in 1990, renamed Saint Catherine Medical Center Fountain Springs
 Blossburg State General Hospital Closed by state in 1972 before divestures began
 Coaldale State General Hospital  Divested from state in 1992, renamed St. Luke's Miners Memorial Hospital.  The hospital is maintained as part of the St. Luke's University Health Network
 Connellsville State General Hospital  Divested from state in 1985, renamed Highlands Hospital and Health Center
 Hazleton State General Hospital  Divested from state in 1986, renamed Hazleton General Hospital
 Nanticoke State General Hospital Divested from state in 1990, renamed Mercy Special Care Hospital of Nanticoke
 Philipsburg State General Hospital Divested from state in 1991, private until 2006, closed 2007 due to bankruptcy, to be demolished
 Punxsutawney State General Hospital
 Scranton State General Hospital Closed by state in 1988 due to no merger partner found for divesture
 Shamokin State General Hospital  Divested from state in 1992, renamed Shamokin Area Community Hospital.  , renamed Geisinger-Shamokin Area Community Hospital, A campus of Geisinger Medical Center.  The hospital is maintained as part of the Geisinger Health System.

References

Hospital networks in the United States
Psychiatric hospitals in Pennsylvania